Najeeb Kanthapuram is an Indian politician belonging to Indian Union Muslim League. He was elected as a member of Kerala Legislative Assembly from Perinthalmanna on 2 May 2021.

Early life
Najeeb Kanthapuram was born to Muhammad Master at Kozhikode on 20 April 1975. He was graduated as a Bachelor of Arts from Farook College, Kozhikode, and as a Bachelor of Education from University of Calicut in the year 1996. He was a journalist who worked with Chandrika (newspaper) over 20 years. He worked in Chandrika (newspaper) in different roles and resigned while he was working as Chief Sub Editor. He has started his political career as unit president of Muslim Students Federation. Later on he became panchayath office bearer of Muslim youth league, then president of Koduvally constituency Muslim Youth League. Later he worked as district youth league treasurer two times. Then he was elected as district youth league president by election. Then he became the senior vice president of MYL, Kerala State.

Political career
Earlier, Najeeb Kanthapuram had been the senior vice-president of MYL since December 2016. Due to the end of term of the last sitting MLA Manjalamkuzhi Ali, Perinthalmanna went to poll as a part of 2021 Kerala general election on 6 April 2021. Najeeb Kanthapuram was the candidate fielded by UDF from Perinthalmanna. There were  registered voters in Perinthalmanna Constituency for the election. Najeeb Kanthapuram won the election by a narrow margin of 38 votes.

Election Performance

Writer 
Apart from being a journalist he made imprints in his career as a lyricist and director. He directed "INIYUM" a socially relevant docu-fiction film based on Nandigram Bengal. He contributed as a lyricist in "'പാടുക നിലാവേ" (Paaduka Nilaave), a ghazal music album composed by V.T. Murali. Singers of the album were M. Jayachandran, P. Sujatha, Venugopal. In 2013 MT Vasudevan Nair released the album "JAYAHE" a revolutionary song written during CPIM Protest gained wide popularity. The song containing the lyrics "ഇത്രയേയുള്ളൂവെന്നറിയുവാന്‍ നമ്മളെത്രദൂരം നടന്നു" (ithreyulluvennariyuvaan nammalethra dhooram nadanu) became popular among the people.

Awards and achievements 
He won several achievements in poetry and speeches since his student life. In the year 2004, he won IMA State award for the feature story അര്‍ബുദത്തിന്റെ തീ നാമ്പുകള്‍, (arbudhathinte thee naambukal) awarded by then health minister M.A. Kuttapan. In 2011, he won K.V. Surendranath state award for best editorial for "ലജ്ജിച്ചു തല താഴ്ത്തുക നാം" (lajjichu thalathaythuka naam) a socially relevant editorial published in Chandrika daily on 9 December 2010. He received the award from the famous poet O.N.V. Kurup at the award ceremony held in Trivandrum.

References 

Indian Union Muslim League politicians
Living people
Kerala MLAs 2021–2026
1975 births